T.J. Rooney (born December 9, 1964) is the former chairman of the Pennsylvania Democratic Party and a former member of the Pennsylvania House of Representatives.

Early life and education
Rooney was born December 9, 1964, in Garden City, New York. He attended West Essex High School in North Caldwell, New Jersey, graduating in 1983, and then Catawba College in Salisbury, North Carolina.

Career
In 1992, Rooney was elected to the Pennsylvania House of Representatives, where he represented the 133rd legislative district.

He retired prior to the 2006 elections. He is currently Managing Director of the Tri State Strategies PA, L.L.C., a Pennsylvania lobbying organization.

Awards and accolades
He was named runner-up for the 2003 Pennsylvania politician of the year by PoliticsPA, a political website, which noted the statewide success of the Democratic Party in winning five of six statewide judicial races and electing Dan Onorato and reelecting John Street. Pennsylvania Report cited his role in Barack Obama's  winning of Pennsylvania in the 2008 presidential election. In 2010, he was named one of the "Top 10 Democrats" in Pennsylvania by Politics magazine.

Personal life
Rooney is a nephew of former Lehigh Valley-area Congressman Fred B. Rooney.

References

External links 

 Pennsylvania State House of Representatives - T.J. Rooney official PA House website (archive)
 Pennsylvania House Democratic Caucus - Representative T.J. Rooney official Party website (archived)

1964 births
Living people
Democratic Party members of the Pennsylvania House of Representatives
Pennsylvania Democratic Party chairs
People from Essex County, New Jersey
People from Garden City, New York
West Essex High School alumni